Heterarthrus is a genus of sawflies belonging to the family Tenthredinidae.

The species of this genus are found in Eurasia and Northern America.

Species:
 Heterarthrus aceris (Kaltenbach, 1856)
 Heterarthrus cuneifrons Altenhofer & Zombori, 1987

References

Tenthredinidae
Sawfly genera